The Hughes 29 is a Canadian sailboat that was designed by Howard Hughes as a cruiser and first built in 1975.

Production
The design was built by Hughes Boat Works in Huron Park, Ontario, Canada, starting in 1975, with about 190 boats completed, but it is now out of production.

Design

The Hughes 29 is a recreational keelboat, built predominantly of fibreglass, with wood trim. It has a masthead sloop rig; a raked stem; a raised counter, reverse transom; an internally mounted spade-type rudder controlled by a wheel and a fixed, swept fin keel. It displaces  and carries  of ballast.

The boat is fitted with a Universal Atomic 4 gasoline engine for docking and manoeuvring.

The design has sleeping accommodation for six people, with a double "V"-berth in the bow cabin, a drop dinette table in the main cabin and two aft cabins. The galley is located on the starboard side just forward of the companionway ladder. The head is located just aft of the bow cabin on the port side.

Operational history
The boat is supported by a class club, the Hughes 29 Site.

See also
List of sailing boat types

References

External links

Keelboats
1970s sailboat type designs
Sailing yachts
Sailboat type designs by Howard Hughes
Sailboat types built by Hughes Boat Works